Frederike Johanna Maria "Femke" Heemskerk (born 21 September 1987) is a former Dutch competitive swimmer who mainly specializes in freestyle, but also has a strong backstroke and medley.

As part of the Dutch team, she holds the short course world records in the 4 × 50 m freestyle relay, 4 × 100 m freestyle relay, and 4×200 m freestyle relay, all set in Doha in 2014. Individually she is owner of six national records, four in long course, 100 m and 200 m freestyle, 100 m backstroke, and 200 m individual medley, and two in short course, 200 m freestyle and 200 m individual medley. She currently represents Energy Standard in the International Swimming League.

Swimming career

Early career
Femke Heemskerk made her international debut at the World LC Championships 2005 in Montreal as a relay-swimmer. She only swum in the heats of the 4×100 m freestyle and the 4×200 m freestyle events. She competed in the European LC Championships 2006 and the European Short Course Swimming Championships. But individually she did not advance past the heats in both events.

At the World LC Championships 2007 she won a bronze medal in the 4×100 m freestyle together with Inge Dekker, Ranomi Kromowidjojo and Marleen Veldhuis. At the 2007 European Short Course Swimming Championships in Debrecen she surprisingly finished 6th in her first international final, the 100 m freestyle. She also finished 10th in the 200 m freestyle.

Spring 2008
In 2008 she swam at the 2008 European Aquatics Championships on the world record breaking 4×100 m freestyle team, which also won bronze in the World Championships the year before. With the same team she ended fourth in the 4×200 m freestyle relay. Individually she did not reach the semi-finals. The next month she competed in Manchester at the World SC Championships 2008 where she again broke two relay records in the 4×200 m freestyle with the same team as in Eindhoven. In the 4×100 m freestyle Hinkelien Schreuder replaced Ranomi Kromowidjojo who suffered from an elbow injury. She won her first individual medal, a silver medal, in the 200 m freestyle at the last day of the tournament. During the National Championships in June 2008, Heemskerk lowered three national records on the long course, 200 m freestyle, 200 m individual medley and 100 m backstroke.

2008 Summer Olympics
At the 2008 Summer Olympics in Beijing she won a gold medal with the 4×100 m freestyle relay. She did so alongside Inge Dekker, Ranomi Kromowidjojo and Marleen Veldhuis in a time of 3:33.76, just 0.14 outside their own world record. The day after she competed individually in the 200 m individual medley where she finished 28th during the heats. Heemskerk was the lead-off swimmer in both 4×200 m freestyle and 4×100 m medley relays, both of which did not qualify for the finals.

Fall 2008
After the Olympics Heemskerk returned to competition at the 2008 European Aquatics Championships where she qualified for the 2009 World Aquatics Championships in the 100 m and 200 m freestyle. The week afterwards she participated in the 2008 European Short Course Swimming Championships in Rijeka, Croatia. There she won a silver medal in the 200 m freestyle behind Federica Pellegrini. She also finished fifth in the 100 m medley. At the end of 2008 she became Amsterdam Sportswoman of the year

2011
In 2011 Heemskerk won a gold medal at the 2011 World Aquatics Championships as part of the 4 × 100 m freestyle relay alongside Inge Dekker, Ranomi Kromowidjojo and Marleen Veldhuis in a time of 3:33.96. She anchored the team with a split time of 52.46, the fastest split in the final by 0.53.

2012

London Olympics
At the 2012 Summer Olympics in London, Heemskerk and her teammates – Ranomi Kromowidjojo, Inge Dekker, Marleen Veldhuis, and Hinkelien Schreuder – won a silver medal in the 4 × 100 m freestyle relay, an event in which they were the defending champions. The gold medal went to Australia.

2014
Heemskerk won her first individual world title at the 2014 world short course championships in Doha, Qatar, in the 100 m freestyle, ahead of Sarah Sjöström and Kromowidjojo. She won three more gold medals in the freestyle relays. In the 4 × 100 m freestyle relay, she swam a split time of 50.58 s, the only split under 51 seconds in the field.

2015
After finishing outside the medals in her individual events (the 100 and 200 meter freestyle) at the 2015 World Aquatics Championships in Kazan, Heemskerk decided to move to France to train with coach Philippe Lucas.

2016 Olympics
Heemskerk qualified for the 2016 Summer Olympics in Rio de Janeiro, her third Olympics, in the 100 and 200 meter freestyle and the 4 × 100 and 4 × 200 meter freestyle relays. With the 4 × 100 meter freestyle relay she finished 4th in the final, after having medalled in the past two Olympics. In the 200 meter freestyle, she finished 16th in the semifinals.

2017
3-5 March 2017 Heemskerk competed in Swim Cup The Hague where she won the 200 m freestyle with a time of 1:56.59, came second in the 100 m freestyle (time 54.19), and came third in the 50 m freestyle with a time of 25.29.

Heemskerk competed in KZNB Challenger in Dordrecht, the Netherlands, on 18 and 19 March 2017. She finished first in 100 m freestyle with a time of 54.27. 

Heemskerk took part in the Swim Cup Eindhoven, the Dutch Championships and also qualification competitions for the 2017 World Aquatics Championships in Budapest on 14-17 July 2017. In the Swim Cup Eindhoven, Heemskerk won the 200 m freestyle event with a time of 1:56.62, securing a place for Budapest. Silver and bronze medals went to Isabel Gose and Robin Neumann who were at least 2.5 seconds slower than Heemskerk. In the 100 m freestyle event Heemskerk reached the finals and finished second with a time of 53.77, securing qualification for the Budapest championships.

International Swimming League 
In the Autumn of 2019 she was member of the inaugural International Swimming League swimming for the Energy Standard International Swim Club, who won the team title in Las Vegas, Nevada, in December.

Personal bests

References

External links
 Official website (archived)
 
 
 
 

1987 births
Living people
People from Kaag en Braassem
World record holders in swimming
Olympic swimmers of the Netherlands
Swimmers at the 2008 Summer Olympics
Swimmers at the 2012 Summer Olympics
Swimmers at the 2016 Summer Olympics
Swimmers at the 2020 Summer Olympics
Olympic gold medalists for the Netherlands
Dutch female backstroke swimmers
Dutch female freestyle swimmers
Dutch female medley swimmers
World Aquatics Championships medalists in swimming
Olympic silver medalists for the Netherlands
Medalists at the FINA World Swimming Championships (25 m)
European Aquatics Championships medalists in swimming
Medalists at the 2012 Summer Olympics
Medalists at the 2008 Summer Olympics
Olympic gold medalists in swimming
Olympic silver medalists in swimming
European Championships (multi-sport event) silver medalists
Sportspeople from South Holland
21st-century Dutch women